Pavoclinus mentalis, the Bearded klipfish, is a species of clinid found from Mozambique to Algoa Bay, South Africa where it occurs in weedy areas in the subtidal zone.  It can reach a maximum length of  TL.

References

mentalis
Fish described in 1908